The number of newspapers in Switzerland was 406 before World War I. It reduced to 257 in 1995. The country was ranked fifteenth for 2014 in the yearly Press Freedom Index published by Reporters Without Borders and 8th in 2020.

List 
Below is a list of newspapers published in Switzerland.

German language

French language

Italian language

Romansh language
 Fegl Ufficial
 La Quotidiana
 Novitas
 Posta Ladina

Ottoman Turkish 
Mizan

Russian language 
 Business in Switzerland
 Nasha Gazeta.ch - Наша Газета.ch

English language

Discontinued 
 Gazette de Lausanne (1798-1991)
 Journal de Genève (1826-1991)
 Journal de Genève et Gazette de Lausanne (1991-1998)
 Le nouveau quotidien (1991-1998), see Le temps
 Dimanche.ch (1999-2003)
 Metro (Swiss edition only, defunct in 2002)
 Heute (2006-2008)
 .ch (2007-2009)
 News (2007-2009)
 Le Matin Bleu (2005-2009)
 Schweiz am Sonntag (2007-2017)

See also
 List of magazines in Switzerland
 List of Media in Switzerland

References

Switzerland

Newspapers